The Odia calendar ( Pāñji) is a solar calendar used by the Odia people from the Odisha region of the Indian subcontinent. The calendar follows the sidereal solar cycle while using the lunar Purnimanta phase for the religious dates. The New Year in the Odia calendar is known as Maha Bishuba Sankranti or Pana Sankranti. It occurs on the first day of the traditional solar month of Meṣa (Georgian: Aries), hence equivalent lunar month Baisakha (odia: ବୈଶାଖ). The Odia calendar follows the Utkaliya era, which began on Bhādra śukla dvādaśī from 592 CE.

New Year and Era

As per the siderial solar cycle followed by the Odia Panjika, the first day of the year or New Year falls on Mesa Sankranti (Sun-crossing into Siderial Aries) in Mid-April. The Odia New Year festival is known as Pana Sankranti or Maha Bishuba Sankranti.

The Utkaliya era ( Utkaḷiya) for the Odia calendar began on 592 CE on Bhādra sukḷa dvādasi (the 12th day of the full moon fortnight of the Bhādra month). Bhādra sukla dvādasi is considered to be the birthday of the legendary king Indradyumna who set up the up the icon of Lord Jagannath (Neela Madhava) at Puri. The epoch seems to correspond to the reign of the legendary early Somavamshis (Kesaris) as per the chronicle Madala Panji, thus implying the era was instituted by King Yayati I of the Somavamshi dynasty.

Thus the Era calendar new year falls on the 12th day of the full moon fortnight or the waxing moon lunar phase of the Bhādra month in September. This day is termed as the Odia financial New Year and is known as the festival of Sunia ( suniā̃) which denotes the start of the beginning of the new financial calendar year for the collection of revenue, publishing of almanacs and the palm-leaf horoscopes carrying the reigning year of the Gajapati King. Post-1947, it has been reduced as a ceremonial day and is mostly used in the Panji calendars to denote the change of Odia calendar year for records and horoscopes.

Anka year

The Anka year ( Aṅka) system is a unique regnal year system instituted by the Eastern Ganga kings for dating their reigns. It had a number of features that mark the regnal year different from that actual duration of the year elapsed during the reign. The system still survives today and is used in the Odia panjis to mark the titular regnal year of the King of Puri, Gajapati Maharaja Dibyasingha Deb of the Puri Estate, whose title carries the legacy of historical ruling monarchs of Odisha.

Features:
 The Anka system always starts on the Odia financial new year called Sunia which falls on the 12th day of the bright fortnight of the month Bhadra (August-September) known as Bhādra Sukḷa Dwādasi. If the king accedes the throne for a few days before this date, then the first year of his reign would then just be a few days long.
 Coins were minted on the date of the new year, and hence the first coins were given the Anka year 2, the number 1 was not used.
 All years ending in 6 were skipped. As in the Anka year 5 was followed by Anka year 7, Anka year 15 was followed by Anka year 17 and so on.
 All years ending in 0 were also skipped, except for the Anka year 10.
Hence no Anka years exist for 1, 6, 16, 20, 26, 30, 36, 40, 46, 50, 56, and so on.

Panji

Madala Panji (Odia: ମାଦଳ ପାଞ୍ଜି) is a chronicle of the Jagannath Temple, Puri in Odisha. It describes the historical events of Odisha related to Jagannath and the Jagannath Temple. The Madala Panji dates from the 12th century and was traditionally written on a year-to-year basis on Vijayadashami Day by the Karanas community. The tradition of keeping this chronicle began with Eastern Ganga king Anantavarman Chodaganga (1077–1150).

The modern Odia calendar begins with the scientific reforms initiated by the astronomer Pathani Samanta. His findings which included astronomical observations with the help of traditional instruments were recorded in his treatise Siddhanta Darpana written on palm-leaf manuscript in 1869 and eventually  published in 1899. These observations were instrumental in the preparation of almanacs in Odisha especially by the astrologers of the Jagannath temple at Puri. The prominent Panjis of this tradition include:
 Khadiratna Panjika
 Samanta Panjika
 Biraja Panjika

Other notable Odia Panji calendars include Kohinoor Panji, Biraja Panji(Nanda), Radharaman Panji(based on Puri tradition Panjis), Bhagyadeepa Panji, Bhagyajyoti Panji, Bhagyachakra Panji.

Months

Days
The Odia calendar incorporates the seven-day week.

Seasons

Time

Festivals
Odia and other Indian festivals observed as per Odia calendar:

References

Bibliography

External links
 Calendars and their History (by L.E. Doggett)
 Indian Calendars (by Leow Choon Lian, pdf, 1.22mb)

Calendar eras
Hindu calendar
Solar calendars
Lunisolar calendars
Time in India
Odia culture